A bleep censor is the replacement of a profanity or classified information with a beep sound (usually a ) in television and radio. It is mainly used in the United Kingdom, Canada, the United States, Australia, New Zealand, Hong Kong and Japan.

Usage

Bleeping has been used for many years as a means of censoring TV and radio programs to remove content not deemed suitable for "family", "daytime", "broadcasting", or "international" viewing, as well as sensitive classified information for security. The bleep censor is a software module, manually operated by a broadcast technician. A bleep is sometimes accompanied by a digital blur or box over the speaker's mouth in cases where the removed speech may still be easily understood by lip reading.

On closed caption subtitling, bleeped words are usually represented by "[bleep]", "[expletive]", "[censored]", "[explicit]", or the profanities with letters substituted with asterisks non-letter symbols, called grawlixes. Where open captions are used (generally in instances where the speaker is not easily understood), a blank is used where the word is bleeped. Occasionally, bleeping is not reflected in the captions, allowing the unedited dialogue to be seen. Sometimes, a "black bar" can be seen for closed caption bleep.

Other uses of bleeping may include reality television, infomercials, game shows and daytime/late night talk shows, where the bleep conceals personally identifying information such as ages, surnames, addresses/hometowns, phone numbers, and attempts to advertise a personal business without advanced or appropriate notice, in order to maintain the subject's privacy (as seen for subjects arrested in episodes of COPS).

On television
Bleeping is commonly used on television programs that use profane words that are forbidden to television networks. Adult comedies use bleep censors to block strong profanities that cannot be used on television, or to allow the content to be broadcast before the watershed in many countries. The 2008 series The Middleman, which aired on the ABC Family network, included the occasional profanity in dialogue, which was bleeped for humorous purposes (with a black bar or a fuzzy image superimposed over the speaker's mouth). Very rarely, the bleep will be light enough to hear the swear word over it.

During a playing of Scenes From a Hat from the 100th episode of the U.S. version of Whose Line Is It Anyway?, one notable scene was "Statements that will get bleeped by the censor."  For each word to be bleeped out that was used by Wayne Brady, Greg Proops, and Colin Mochrie (in that order), a red bar was placed over their mouths with the word "CENSORED" in white text. 

On April 21st, 2010, the South Park episode 201 aired, which bleeped out all mentions of Muhammad and covered him with a box that says Censored due to death threats.

Regulations

Advertising in the United Kingdom 
Under the Ofcom guidelines, television and radio commercials are not allowed to use bleeps to obscure swearing under BACC/CAP guidelines. However, this does not apply to program trailers or cinema advertisements and "fuck" is bleeped out of two cinema advertisements for Johnny Vaughan's Capital FM show and the cinema advertisement for the Family Guy season 5 DVD. An advert for esure insurance released in October 2007 uses the censor bleep, as well as a black star placed over the speaker's mouth, to conceal the name of a competitor company the speaker said she used to use. The Comedy Central advert for South Park: Bigger, Longer & Uncut had a version of "Kyle's Mom's a Bitch" where vulgarities were bleeped out, though the movie itself did not have censorship, and was given a 15 rating, despite a high amount of foul language.

A Barnardo's ad, released in summer 2007, has two versions: one where a boy can be heard saying "fuck off" four times which is restricted to "18" rated cinema screenings, and one where a censor bleep sound obscures the profanity which is still restricted to "15" and "18" rated films. Neither is permitted on UK television.

Trailers for programs containing swearing are usually bleeped until well after the watershed, and it is very rare for any trailer to use the most severe swearwords uncensored.

See also 

Expurgation
Family Viewing Hour
Grawlix
Minced oath
Pixelization
Profanity
Radio edit
Sanitization (classified information)
Self-censorship
Tape delay (broadcasting)
"Beep" (song), a 2006 song by The Pussycat Dolls which incorporates bleeps; see also the 2010 3OH!3 song "Touchin' on My"
"I Bet You They Won't Play This Song on the Radio", a song by Eric Idle that uses comic sound effects for many bleeps
The Morning Show with Mike and Juliet, an American talk show that, in 2008, gained notoriety for using a variation of the bleep censor dubbed a "bleep photo"

References 

Broadcast engineering
Censorship
Censorship of broadcasting
Euphemisms
Profanity
Prudishness
Self-censorship